Josephus Gerardus Dominicus "Sef" Vergoossen (born 5 August 1947 in Echt) is a former Dutch football manager.

Biography
Vergoossen began his managerial career in 1978 with VVV-Venlo, managing the club for 12 years until 1989, after which he managed MVV for nine years and Roda JC for three years, whom he led to victory in the 1999–2000 KNVB Cup. Subsequently, he managed Belgian giants Racing Genk between 2001 and 2004, winning the Manager of the Year award at the Belgian professional football awards in 2001–02.

In 2006, Vergoosen moved to Japan and managed Nagoya Grampus Eight, which had previously been successfully managed by former Arsenal manager Arsène Wenger. In 2008, Vergoossen was appointed interim manager of PSV Eindhoven in January 2008, whom he led to winning the 2007–08 Eredivisie title. After his successful tenure at PSV ended, Vergoossen moved on to work for his previous club Genk as an advisor on a part-time basis. In January 2009, after his successor Huub Stevens resigned at PSV, Vergoosen was named as one of the top candidates for the managerial role, having successfully led the side to the Eredivisie title the previous season.

On 10 August 2022, Vergoossen returned to Roda JC to advise supervisory directors in the field of football technical matters.

Managerial statistics

Honours
Roda JC
KNVB Cup: 1999–2000

Genk
Belgian First Division: 2001–02
Jules Pappaert Cup: 2001–02

PSV Eindhoven
Eredivisie: 2007–08

Individual
Belgian Professional Manager of the Year: 2001–02

References

External links

1947 births
Living people
Dutch football managers
People from Echt-Susteren
VVV-Venlo managers
MVV Maastricht managers
Roda JC Kerkrade managers
PSV Eindhoven managers
Eredivisie managers
J1 League managers
Nagoya Grampus managers
Dutch expatriate football managers
Expatriate football managers in Japan
Expatriate football managers in the United Arab Emirates
K.R.C. Genk managers
Al Jazira Club managers
Dutch expatriate sportspeople in the United Arab Emirates
Dutch expatriate sportspeople in Japan
Dutch expatriate sportspeople in Belgium
Expatriate football managers in Belgium
Sportspeople from Limburg (Netherlands)